Lithium triborate (LiB3O5) or LBO is a non-linear optical crystal.  It has a wide transparency range, moderately high nonlinear coupling, high damage threshold and desirable chemical and mechanical properties. This crystal is often used for second harmonic generation (SHG, also known as frequency doubling), for example of Nd:YAG lasers (1064 nm → 532 nm). LBO can be both critically and non-critically phase-matched. In the latter case the crystal has to be heated or cooled depending on the wavelength.

Lithium triborate was discovered and developed by Chen Chuangtian and others of the Fujian Institute of Research on the Structure of Matter, Chinese Academy of Sciences.  It has been patented.

Chemical properties
Point group: mm2
Lattice parameters: a=8.4473 Å, b=7.3788 Å, c=5.1395 Å
Mohs hardness: 6
Transmission range: 0.16 – 2.6 μm
Damage threshold: 25 J/cm2 (1064 nm, 10 ns pulses)
Thermal expansion coefficients: x: 10.8×10−5/K, y: −8.8×10−5/K, z: 3.4×10−5/K
Specific heat: 1060 J/kg·K
Melting point: 834 °C

Applications of lithium triborate (LBO) crystal
Lithium triborate (LBO) crystals are applicable in various nonlinear optical applications:
Frequency doubling (SHG) and frequency tripling of high peak power pulsed Nd doped, Ti:Sapphire lasers and Dye lasers
NCPM (non-critical phase matching for frequency conversion of CW and quasi CW radiation
OPO (Optical parametric oscillator) of both Type 1 and Type 2 phase-matching

References

External links
LBO Crystal (Lithium Triborate) at www.redoptronics.com

Borates
Nonlinear optical materials
Crystals
Lithium compounds